Brigadier Eric Lacy Vowles,   (13 July 1893 – 28 September 1977) was an Australian soldier who served during the First World War and Second World War.

Vowels served at Gallipoli, in France, Palestine, and New Guinea.

As its commandant for four years, he positioned RMC Duntroon for post war training.  He retired from the Army on 13 June 1949.

Early life and education
Vowels was born on 13 July 1893, the second son of Thomas Vowles and Mary,  Lacy.

His mother died on 18 May 1908.  Thomas Vowles was post master at Perth and later pay master at Melbourne GPO.

Vowles was born at Melbourne, Victoria.  He was educated at Scots [Scotch] College, Western Australia.

His older brother, Alan, was also a decorated officer.

Vowles studied engineering before enlisting and was one of the original students in 1911 at the Royal Military College, Duntroon, graduating 28th in August 1914.  Vowels was appointed as Lieutenant in November 1914.

As a cadet at RMC Duntroon, he designed the Corps of Staff Cadets badge.

Adult life
Vowels and his wife had two children, a son Robert, and a daughter Prudence, a librarian who had worked for a time at the RMC Duntroon library.

Career

WWI
Vowles was allocated to the 9th Battery of the 1st Division at Gallipoli, directing naval guns during the landing.

After evacuation to Egypt he was transferred to the 5th Division and in June 1916 saw action in the Battle of Fromelles.  In August 1917 he took command of 54 Battery of the 5th Division.  In 1916 Vowles was described as .. this officer knows his work, is cool and collected under fire .. by his commanding officer.

Major Vowels was wounded in December 1917,  by gassing, and evacuated to England.

From late 1918 to February 1919 Vowles served with the Royal Horse Artillery in Palestine.

Inter bella
Vowels was an instructor in artillery at RMC Duntroon until February 1920.

He attended Camberly Staff College, England during 1926–27.

Transferred from Keswick, Adelaide, Fourth Military District South Australia, to Brisbane July 1938.  Lieutenant Colonel Vowels was appointed as General Staff Officer of the 11th Mixed Brigade in charge of training operations in Queensland.

Transferred from First Military District Queensland to Director of Military Art and second in command RMC Duntroon February 1939.

Promoted to Colonel March 1940.

WWII
Director of Military Training at AHQ from November 1939 to January 1942.

Vowles commenced as Commandant 6th Military District January 1942, Tasmanian Forces.

Vowles was re-appointed Temporary Brigadier July 1942.

During 1943-44 he commanded 12th Australian Infantry Brigade, and two base areas in New Guinea.

RMC Duntroon
In March 1945 he became commandant RMC Duntroon, which included the Army School of Civil Affairs, a position he held until his retirement in 1949.

Vowles took the RMC from two year courses to three year courses to four year courses.

Re-appointed Temporary Brigadier February 1946.

During Vowles' tenure RMC Duntroon moved to educate officers to a university degree standard.

There was some public concern that RMC Duntroon was not sufficiently up-to-date, but Vowles was considered to be .. fully seized with the vital importance of keeping Duntroon's progress well abreast of modern trends ...

Vowles espoused broader scientific training for atomic warfare for Australian Army officers.

He lobbied for a dedicated library building, the lack of which was impeding the library's growth, and for improved dental services.

Awards and recognition
 Military Cross on the Somme
 Silver Medal of Military Valor (Italian)
 Twice Mentioned in dispatches
 Coronation Medal (1937)

Notes

References

Further reading
 A sample of archived newspaper articles via TROVE.

1893 births
1977 deaths
Military personnel from Melbourne
Australian Army personnel of World War II
Graduates of the Staff College, Camberley
Royal Military College, Duntroon graduates
Australian recipients of the Military Cross
Recipients of the Silver Medal of Military Valor
Australian brigadiers
Australian military personnel of World War I